La Palmera is a district of the San Carlos canton, in the Alajuela province of Costa Rica.

History 
La Palmera was created on 5 February 1952 by Decreto Ejecutivo 15.

Geography 
La Palmera has an area of  km² which makes it the eleventh district of the canton by area and a mean elevation of  metres.

It is located at an elevation range between 100 and 2200 meters above sea level.

It is located in the northern region of the country and borders four districts; Cutris to the north, Aguas Zarcas to the East, Florencia  and y Quesada  to the west. While to the south it borders with the canton of Sarchí.

Its head, the town of La Palmera, is located 19.4 km (54 minutes) NE of Ciudad Quesada and 106 km (3 hours 4 minutes) to the NW of San Jose the capital of the nation.

Demographics 

For the 2011 census, La Palmera had a population of  inhabitants.
It is the tenth more populated district of the canton, behind of Quesada, Aguas Zarcas, Pital, La Fortuna, Florencia, Pocosol and Cutris.

Transportation

Road transportation 
The district is covered by the following road routes:
 National Route 4
 National Route 140
 National Route 747
 National Route 748

Settlements 
La Palmera has 6 population centers:
La Palmera (head of the district)
La Marina
Santa Rosa
Concepción
San Francisco
La Unión

Economy 

The main activity of this place is livestock, and in less proportion the cultivation of citrus, sugar cane, roots and tubers. There is also the exploitation of calcium carbonate.

Tourist services are also offered in the facilities of La Marina and the thermal waters (shares sources with Aguas Zarcas) where you can appreciate the nature that characterizes the place.

La Palmera urban area, has health services, educational, restaurants and grocery stores.

References 

Districts of Alajuela Province
Populated places in Alajuela Province